GlobalVision is a SaaS software company specializing in packaging and labelling.

History 
Global Vision Inc. (GlobalVision) was founded in 1990 by Reuben Malz. It is headquartered in Montreal, Canada, and has regional offices in the UK and Germany.

In 2013 Pfizer contracted with GlobalVision for packaging quality control.  

GlobalVision introduced its first web-based Quality Control Platform, QCanywhere, in 2013. This was followed by the introduction of a more advanced version of the platform, Proofware, in 2014. 

In 2017, GlobalVision released a desktop Quality Control Platform. 

In 2018, GlobalVision partnered with Pantone and X-Rite to launch the world’s first digital Color Inspection system for print & packaging.

References 

Canadian companies established in 1990
Software companies established in 1990
Companies based in Montreal
Automation software
Braille technology
Packaging industry
Packaging
Machine vision
Print production
Platform virtualization software